Felix Standaert is a Belgian diplomat and former Belgian ambassador to Ruanda and 1977 - 1980 to the Holy See. He was a member of the Coudenberg group, a Belgian federalist think tank.

Sources
 Discours de l’ambassadeur Felix Standaert au Pape Paul VI à l’occasion de la présentation de ses lettres de créance (1977)

1947 births
Living people
Belgian civil servants
Belgian diplomats
Ambassadors of Belgium to Rwanda
Ambassadors of Belgium to the Holy See